Iurie Dudoglo (born 9 July 1991) is a Moldovan male weightlifter, competing in the 56/62 kg category and representing Moldova at international competitions. He competed at world championships, including at the 2010, 2011, and 2015 World Weightlifting Championships. He also competed for Moldova at 2010, 2016, and 2017 European Weightlifting Championships. In 2018 he was issued a ban until 2025 by the International Weightlifting Federation after testing positive for Clenbuterol.

Major results

References

External links
 
 

1991 births
Living people
Moldovan male weightlifters
Place of birth missing (living people)
Doping cases in weightlifting
Moldovan sportspeople in doping cases
European Weightlifting Championships medalists
21st-century Moldovan people